The Poteau Work Center is a utility building located at the Poteau District Headquarters of the Ouachita National Forest in Waldron, Arkansas.  It is a rectangular single-story wood-frame building with gable roof, and is distinguished by centrally-located garage doors on each of its long sides.  The building was (along with the adjacent residence), constructed about 1939 by a work crew of the Civilian Conservation Corps.

The building was listed on the National Register of Historic Places in 1993.

See also
National Register of Historic Places listings in Scott County, Arkansas

References

Government buildings on the National Register of Historic Places in Arkansas
Buildings and structures completed in 1939
Buildings and structures in Scott County, Arkansas
Ouachita National Forest
National Register of Historic Places in Scott County, Arkansas
1939 establishments in Arkansas